Reuben B. Robertson Jr. (June 27, 1908 – March 13, 1960) was an American businessman who served as United States Deputy Secretary of Defense from 1955 to 1957.

He died on March 13, 1960, in Cincinnati, Ohio after being hit by a car.

References

1908 births
1960 deaths
United States Deputy Secretaries of Defense
People from Asheville, North Carolina
People from Cincinnati
North Carolina Republicans
Ohio Republicans
Road incident deaths in Ohio
Pedestrian road incident deaths